AC Restaurants en Hotels is a horeca chain that was founded in 1963 in the Netherlands. Today there are 40 chains of the company including 12 hotels (in the Netherlands mainly part of Tulip Inn).

History

In 1963 AC Restaurants was started as a part of the retailer corporation Albert Heijn (later Ahold). The letter combination AC stands for Alberts Corner.  

Since 1998 AC Restaurants & Hotels was bought by the Italian corporation Autogrill. Autogrill is controlled by Schematrentaquattro S.R.L. a company of the Benetton family, including through Sintonia SA is the main shareholder of the Italian motorway Autostrade SpA.

Locations by country

External links
 Official website

Restaurant chains in the Netherlands